Divisions are the primary subdivisions of Sabah and Sarawak, the states in East Malaysia. Each division is subdivided into districts — this is different in Peninsular Malaysia whereby districts are generally the primary subdivisions of a state. Each division is headed by a resident.

The 17 divisions are:

Sabah 

 Sabah
 West Coast Division
 Interior Division
 Kudat Division
 Sandakan Division
 Tawau Division

Sarawak 

 Sarawak
 Betong Division
 Bintulu Division
 Kapit Division
 Kuching Division
 Limbang Division
 Miri Division
 Mukah Division
 Samarahan Division
 Sarikei Division
 Serian Division
 Sibu Division
 Sri Aman Division

See also 
 Geography of Malaysia

References 

 
Subdivisions of Malaysia
Divisions
Malaysia 2, Divisions